The 1989–90 Notre Dame Fighting Irish men's basketball team represented the University of Notre Dame during the 1989-90 college basketball season. The Irish were led by head coach Digger Phelps, in his 19th season.

Roster

Schedule and results

|-
!colspan=9 style=| Regular Season

|-
!colspan=9 style=| NCAA tournament

References

Notre Dame Fighting Irish men's basketball seasons
Notre Dame
Notre Dame
Notre Dame Fighting Irish
Notre Dame Fighting Irish